P. Michael Sturla (born February 18, 1956) is an American politician serving as a Democratic member of the Pennsylvania House of Representatives.  He has represented the 96th District in Lancaster County, including the city of Lancaster, since 1991. Sturla served as House Democratic Policy Committee Chair until 2020. He currently serves as the Democratic minority chair of the House Urban Affairs Committee.

For most of his tenure in the legislature, he has been the only Democrat representing a significant portion of Lancaster County at the state or federal level.

Biography
Sturla graduated from the University of Kansas in 1979 with a degree in environmental design.  After college, he founded a painting and construction firm with his brother and later founded Aarchitrave, an architecture firm.

He was elected to the Lancaster City Council in 1987 and served on the Council until his election to the House.

In August 2011, Sturla stirred controversy with written remarks he made about proposed drilling in the Marcellus Shale regions of Pennsylvania.  He wrote that increased drilling would lead to the "spread of sexually transmitted disease amongst the womenfolk."  Sturla apologized for his "insensitive" remarks, but defended himself by saying that his comments were based on a report to the Marcellus Shale Advisory Commission.

Mike Sturla endorsed Tom Wolf in the 2014 Democratic Primary for Governor.

Sturla currently sits on the Urban Affairs committee.

References

External links
Campaign Website: https://www.votesturla.net/
Pennsylvania House of Representatives - Mike Sturla Official PA House website

Pennsylvania House Democratic Caucus - Rep. Mike Sturla Official Party website

1956 births
Living people
Democratic Party members of the Pennsylvania House of Representatives
Politicians from Lancaster, Pennsylvania
University of Kansas alumni
Pennsylvania city council members
21st-century American politicians